Congreve is a surname. Notable people with the surname include:

 Ambrose Congreve (1907–2011), Irish industrialist, best known for his world-famous garden at Mount Congreve
 Billy Congreve (1891–1916)
 Cameron Congreve, Swansea City footballer, born 2004
 Cecil Ralph Townshend Congreve (1876–1952), English tea planter in India
 Galfred Congreve (fl. 1850–1881), Scottish amateur footballer and cricketer, later a civil servant
 Richard Congreve (1818–1899), English philosopher
 Walter Congreve, Governor of Malta from 1924 to 1926
 William Congreve (1670–1729), English playwright
 Sir William Congreve, 1st Baronet (1742–1814), pioneer in gunpowder production
 Sir William Congreve, 2nd Baronet (1772–1828), creator of the Congreve rocket